Ivi Monteiro (born November 16, 1984 in Rio de Janeiro) is a butterfly and freestyle swimmer from Brazil.

At the 2002 South American Games, in Belém, she won three gold medals in the 100-metre butterfly, 4×100-metre freestyle and 4×100-metre medley, and the bronze medal in the 200-metre butterfly.

Participating in the 2003 World Aquatics Championships, in Barcelona, she finished 14th in the 4×100-metre medley, 25th in the 100-metre butterfly, and 34th in the 50-metre butterfly.

At the 2003 Pan American Games in Santo Domingo, Dominican Republic, Monteiro finished 4th in the 4×100-metre medley, and 5th in the 100-metre butterfly.

On May 9, 2004, she broke the South American record in the 4×100-metre medley, with a time of 4:12.90, along with Fabíola Molina, Mariana Katsuno and Rebeca Gusmão. With this time, the Brazilian team was, at this time, qualifying for Athens 2004, but later, other countries obtained best marks, and took the Monteiro vacancy for the Olympics.

She ended her career in late 2013, at the Open tournament, held in Porto Alegre, Brazil.

References

1984 births
Living people
Brazilian female butterfly swimmers
Brazilian female freestyle swimmers
Swimmers at the 2003 Pan American Games
South American Games gold medalists for Brazil
South American Games bronze medalists for Brazil
South American Games medalists in swimming
Competitors at the 2002 South American Games
Pan American Games competitors for Brazil
Swimmers from Rio de Janeiro (city)
21st-century Brazilian women
20th-century Brazilian women